Don Summigen Jayasundera (1911 – 11 October 1964) was a cricketer who played first-class cricket for Ceylon between 1934 and 1942. He toured India in 1940-41.

He was one of Ceylon's fastest bowlers. He took 10 wickets in an innings three times in club cricket in Ceylon, and five hat-tricks. His best first-class figures were 4 for 33 and 2 for 42 in Ceylon's victory over Madras in 1940–41.

References

External links

1911 births
1964 deaths
Alumni of Saint Joseph's College, Colombo
Sri Lankan cricketers
Sinhalese Sports Club cricketers
All-Ceylon cricketers